Branyan may refer to:

Branyan, Queensland, a locality in the Bundaberg Region, Queensland, Australia

People with the surname
John Branyan (born 1965), American comedian
Russell Branyan (born 1975), American baseball player